Barawa District is a district in the southeastern Lower Shabelle (Shabeellaha Hoose) region of Somalia. Its capital lies at Barawa (Brava).

References

External links
 Districts of Somalia
 Administrative map of Barawa District

Districts of Somalia

Lower Shabelle